The Canon EF-S 18–200mm lens is a superzoom lens, manufactured by Canon.

References

External links

Review at dpreview.com
Review at photozone.de
Review at the-digital-picture.com
Anandtech: Canon EOS 50D overview

18-200mm lens
Camera lenses introduced in 2008